Gilbertsville Historic District is a national historic district in Gilbertsville, New York.  It was listed on the National Register of Historic Places in 1974.  Its boundaries were increased to approximately the incorporated village borders in 1982.

References

Historic districts on the National Register of Historic Places in New York (state)
Federal architecture in New York (state)
National Register of Historic Places in Otsego County, New York